Woe (pronounced Wo-ay)  is a small rural town in Ghana's Volta region near the larger town of Keta. Woe's economy relies heavily on fishing.

A notable landmark there is a large lighthouse called Cape St. Paul Lighthouse  on the beach that guides ships away from a mythical massive underwater mountain. This lighthouse is also thought to be the oldest in Ghana.

The predominant local language of Woe is Ewe.

In 1962 the population of Woe was 3,450.

References

Populated places in the Volta Region